Mitov is a Bulgarian masculine surname, its feminine counterpart is Mitova. It may refer to:
Anton Mitov (1862–1930), Bulgarian painter, art critic and art historian
Daniel Mitov (born 1977), Bulgarian politician and Minister of Foreign Affairs 
David Mitov Nilsson (born 1991), Macedonian-Swedish football player
Dobromir Mitov (born 1972), Bulgarian football coach and former defender 
Georgi Mitov (1875–1900), Bulgarian painter, brother of Anton
Hristo Mitov (born 1985), Bulgarian football goalkeeper
Nikolay Mitov (born 1972), Bulgarian football player
Silviya Mitova (born 1976), Bulgarian Olympic artistic gymnast
Veli Mitova, Bulgarian-South African philosopher
Zorica Mitov (born 1988), Serbian basketball player

Bulgarian-language surnames